Alex Menal (born August 9, 1972) is a French athlete who specialises in the 100, 200 and 60 meters. Menal competed at the 1997 IAAF World Indoor Championships in Paris.

References

External links

French male sprinters
French people of Guadeloupean descent
Living people
1972 births
Mediterranean Games silver medalists for France
Mediterranean Games medalists in athletics
Athletes (track and field) at the 2001 Mediterranean Games
Place of birth missing (living people)